An Ordinary Day may refer to:

 "An Ordinary Day" (song), by g.o.d
 An Ordinary Day (album), by g.o.d